Mulungushi University is  one of the public universities of Zambia. Previously known as the National College of Management and Development Studies, it was turned into a university by the Zambian Government in a public-private partnership with Konkola Copper Mines in 2008. The university consists of three campuses: the Main Campus, or Great North Road Campus, located 26 kilometers North of Kabwe on the banks of the Mulungushi River; the Town Campus, located along Mubanga Road, off Munkoyo Street, near the center of Kabwe town; and the Livingstone Campus, located in Livingstone, which is home to the medical school. The university provides bachelor's degrees and master's degrees for full-time and distance education. In 2009, more than 500 distance education students enrolled. They were mainly former diploma students of the National College for Management and Development Studies.

The Main (Great North Road) Campus is located near the Mulungushi Rock of Authority, a kopje often called the Birthplace of Zambian Independence, where Kenneth Kaunda and the Zambian African National Congress secretly met for rallies. Today, a more accessible rock is still used for political conventions and meetings as well as graduation ceremonies of the university. A series of chalets were built to house dignitaries and other guests.

Schools
Mulungushi University has seven schools and offers degrees in 118 programs.
 School of Agriculture and Natural Resources
 Department of Agricultural Economics and Agribusiness
 Department of Natural Resources and Environmental Sciences
 Department of Agricultural Biotechnology and Bio-sciences
 School of Social Science
 Department of Social Development Studies
 Department of Economics
 School of Business Studies
 Department of Business Studies
 Department of Law, Labour & Human Resource Management
 School of Engineering and Technology
 Department of Computer Science and Information Technology
 Department of Engineering
 School of Natural and Applied Science
 Department of Mathematics and Statistics
 Department of Physics
 Department of Chemistry and Biology
 School of Education
 School of Medicine and Health Sciences
 Department of Basic Sciences
 Department of Pharmacology
 Department of Anatomy

In addition to the Schools and Departments, Mulungushi University has various other educational and administrative units. One important unit is the Library, which is an information and learning focal point for management, lecturers, students, and researchers. The university has two libraries, namely the Main Campus Library and the Kabwe Town Campus Library. The libraries run similar services. The library at the Main (Great North Road) Campus, named the Friedrich Ebert Memorial Library, was designated a United Nations (UN) Repository Library in September 1978 when the institution was a college. The Library has also been a World Bank Repository since February 2007, as well as a Friedrich Ebert Foundation Repository. Other items in the collection include newspaper collections of the Times of Zambia, Zambia Daily Mail, and the Post News paper.

The two libraries are accessible to students and staff of the Institution. ICTs The Library has a number of student computers running on a Local Area Network (LAN) with an Internet connection. The Libraries are headed by a University Librarian.

References

Universities in Zambia
Kabwe
Buildings and structures in Central Province, Zambia
Educational institutions established in 2008
2008 establishments in Zambia